Terresa M. Graves (January 10, 1948October 10, 2002), credited as Teresa Graves, was an American actress and singer best known for her starring role as undercover police detective Christie Love in the ABC crime-drama television series Get Christie Love! (1974–1975). Graves was the second African-American woman to star in her own hour–long television series and the first for a drama television series.

Career

Singing
Graves was born on January 10, 1948, the middle of three children in Houston, Texas to Marshall (1921–1967) and Willie Graves (1920–2005). After graduating from high school in 1966, Graves began the early portion of her career as a singer with The Doodletown Pipers. She also recorded a self-titled album in 1970.

Acting
She soon turned to acting and became a regular in the two variety shows: Our Place (1967) and the infamous single episode of Turn-On (1969). In 1969, Graves toured with Bob Hope's USO tour in Southeast Asia. Graves later landed more acting roles, becoming a regular on Rowan & Martin's Laugh-In during its third season. Graves appeared in several films. In the 1973 film That Man Bolt, in which she played Samantha Nightingale, Graves' character is shot to death when she is in bed during a love scene with Fred Williamson, who plays the leading role of Jefferson Bolt.

Graves pivotal role in the 1974 ABC crime drama television movie and later series Get Christie Love! featured Charles Cioffi and Jack Kelly as Lieutenants Reardon and Ryan, respectively, Love's supervisors. At the time of the series creation, Graves' was noted as the second African-American woman to star in her own hour–long television series, after Diahann Carroll in Julia which aired six years prior. An article in the November 1974 issue of Jet magazine described Graves as "television's most delightful detective, the epitome of a tough lady cop with more feminine features than Venus". In 1983, Graves retired from show business to devote her time to her faith.

Personal life and death
 Graves was baptized as a Jehovah's Witness in 1974, and almost immediately began using her celebrity to bring international awareness to the persecution of Witnesses in Malawi under then-leader Hastings Kamuzu Banda's "one-party rule".

For the rest of her life, Graves resided at 3437 West 78th Place in the Hyde Park neighborhood in Los Angeles, California where she cared for her mother. On October 10, 2002, Graves' home caught fire due to a space heater. Graves was found unconscious in a bedroom before being rushed to the hospital where she later died. She was 54 years old.

Acting roles

Awards and nominations

References

External links

 
 

1948 births
2002 deaths
20th-century American actresses
Accidental deaths in California
Actresses from Texas
20th-century African-American women singers
Converts to Jehovah's Witnesses
American Jehovah's Witnesses
American women pop singers
Deaths from fire in the United States
Musicians from Houston
Traditional pop music singers
African-American actresses
American television actresses
American film actresses
American sketch comedians
20th-century American women singers
20th-century American singers
21st-century African-American people
21st-century African-American women
United Service Organizations entertainers